Fernando González was the defending champion.

Gastón Gaudio won the title, defeating González 6–3, 6–4 in the final.

Seeds

  Gastón Gaudio (champion)
  Fernando González (final)
  Filippo Volandri (semifinals)
  David Ferrer (semifinals)
  Mariano Zabaleta (quarterfinals)
  José Acasuso (quarterfinals)
  Agustín Calleri (quarterfinals)
  Potito Starace (first round)

Draw

Finals

Top half

Bottom half

External links
 Main draw
 Qualifying draw

Singles